William Winfield Farley (November 10, 1944 – September 2, 2018) was an American swimming coach and former competition swimmer.

Farley represented the United States at the 1964 Summer Olympics in Tokyo.  He advanced to the event final of the men's 1,500-meter freestyle, and finished fourth overall with a time of 17:18.2.

Farley attended the University of Michigan, and swam for the Michigan Wolverines swimming and diving team in National Collegiate Athletic Association (NCAA) competition from 1963 to 1965.  He was a ten-time All-American as a college swimmer.

See also
 List of University of Michigan alumni

References

External links
  Bill Farley – Coach profile at FairfieldStags.com
 

1944 births
2018 deaths
American male freestyle swimmers
Fairfield Stags
Michigan Wolverines men's swimmers
Michigan Wolverines swimming coaches
Sportspeople from Middlesex County, Massachusetts
Princeton Tigers coaches
Swimmers at the 1963 Pan American Games
Swimmers at the 1964 Summer Olympics
Olympic swimmers of the United States
Pan American Games competitors for the United States